Perfume Art Creation, is a perfumed art-producing company combining authentic fragrances from Grasse, Southern France, and an art gallery based in Zollikerberg, Switzerland.

History
In 2018 Goar Sekhian Sanfilippo, initiated Perfume Art Creation. The artistic origin of fragrances inspired Goar to create the Art Seasons in her gallery. Goar’s source of inspiration is the natural resource of Grasse: jasmine, rose, lavender, and orange blossom and particularly Galimard historical perfume formulas․ Its fragrance-infused artworks and paintings are the copyright concept of Perfume Art Creation, which allows the viewer visually to explore the artwork, to smell it, allowing for holistic stimulation of the senses. The collaboration with international painters gave birth to a perfumed art collection - The Perfumed Painting is Innovation and Copyright © by Perfume Art Creation in Zollikerberg (Zürich) Switzerland. The Perfumed Art Creation copyright concept is a new branch in Modern and in Contemporary Art that is completing the chain of many olfactory exhibitions and trials in a unique and permanent way.

Presented to the public for decades Art and Olfactory was developed in multiple ways, however, it is the first time that visual and olfactive perceptions are grouped in one painting, artwork, or sculpture. The concept is based on the own selection of each artist choosing his/her visual and personal perfume smell, then the two preferred components are merged together, and the collectors are possessing their perfumed art in their own environment. Perfumed art is an art where the person will never be missed.

Working and creating commonly with the artists, the paintings are infused with the preferred collector’s perfume and scent, and his or her individual or corporate fragrance is introduced into the art. The Perfumed Paintings are fragrance-infused artworks allowing viewers to not only visually explore the artwork but also smell it, allowing a holistic stimulation of the senses.

In 2018 Perfume Art Creation started with the artist shows organized on the premises of the Hotel Chateau Gütsch in Lucerne and in 2020 Perfume Art Creation Gallery opened in a 300-year-old Swiss Traditional House located in Zollikerberg (Zurich). The second Perfume Art Creation branch opened in Venice (Dorsoduro) in 2022, and the third branch in Paris will open in 2023.

The main priority of the gallery is to give the pedestal to the artist and bring them to the “tête à tête” contact with the public. Through the symbiosis of two elements olfactory and visual Perfume Art Creation is creating the modern and contemporary Fine Art. Fulfilling the role of the art curator, Perfume Art Creation Gallery is an independent concept that forms exhibitions without any external support and influence.

Exhibitions

2023
 Luce Veneziana Perfume Art Creation Zollikerberg
 "Erik Strauss", Perfume Art Creation Gallery Venezia. Vernissage “ARCHE” di ERIK STRAUSS.

2022
 "Luce Veneziana", Perfume Art Creation Gallery Venezia by Carla Erizzo.
 "Cyber Time Travelling", Zollikerberg Solo exhibition by architect & artist Victoria Lubinska-Felix.
 “Smell of the Power”, Venice, Italy, Solo exhibition by Rosanna Basilio.
 "Shadows of Realism", Zollikerberg Solo exhibition by painter Pjotrs Kirjusa.
 "Grace of Instant", Zollikerberg Solo exhibition by artist and designer Julia Krus
 “From Abundance to Success”, Zollikerberg Solo Exhibition by Elena Kirillova.

2021
 "L’Art Parfumé", Gallery Joseph, Rue Turenne, Paris, France. Group exhibition by Vik SCHROEDER, Mayuko OKADA, Julia KRUSE.
 “書 ・ 墨象 Schrift --- Bilder“ Zollikerberg, Solo exhibition by Suishū T. Klopfenstein-Arii.
 “Il 42° incontro artistico LE COLONETE Venice, Italy. Group Exhibition by Rosanna Basilio, Carla Erizzo, Natalia Gerasimova, Erik Strauss, Giacomo Gilli.
 "My Zurich" Zollikerberg, Solo exhibition by Britt Edelmann.
 “Our Radio”, Zürich, Performance by Philippe Eiselen.
 “Primavera Arte”, Padua, Italy. Group Exhibition by Rosanna Basilio, Carla Erizzo, Natalia Gerasimova, Erik Strauss, Giacomo Gilli.
 “Women’s souls colours”, Zollikerberg, Solo Exhibition by Cecilia Betancourt.

2020
 “Happy Womens Day”, Zollikerberg. Group Exhibition by Jenya Hitz, Vik Schroeder, Julia Kruse, Mayuko Okada.
 “Time Record” Zollikerberg Solo Exhibition by Veronika Moshnikov.
 “Oshi-e  押し絵 “Luzern, Hotel Château Gütsch Solo Exhibition by Mayuko Okada.
 “Carnival of Life” Luzern, Hotel Château Gütsch Solo Exhibition by Elena Marconi.
 “Tatiana’s Day” Luzern, Hotel Château Gütsch Solo Exhibition by Tatyana Nazarenko.

2019, 2018
 “I bring the Love of our Universe”, Luzern, Hotel Château Gütsch Solo Exhibition by Vik Schroeder.
 “Farben und Formen”, Luzern, Hotel Château Gütsch Solo Exhibition by Sibila Roth – Petrova.
 “Ink Beyond”, Luzern, Hotel Château Gütsch Solo Exhibition by Yuuko Suzuki.
 “Dreamscapes”, Luzern, Hotel Château Gütsch Solo Exhibition by Kerstin Hochuli.
 “Deep Surfaces” Luzern, Hotel Château Gütsch Solo Exhibition by Andrea Sbra Perego.
 “Overlaps” Luzern, Hotel Château Gütsch Solo Exhibition by Michele Liuzzi.
 “CASE” Luzern, Hotel Château Gütsch. Group Exhibition by Michele Liuzzi, Elena Kirillova, Andrea Sbra Perego.

References

External links

Further reading
 Zolliker Zumiker Bote Freitag, 4 Februar 2022, 113. Jahrgang, Nr.5

Art galleries established in 2020
Art museums and galleries in Switzerland
Arts events
Contemporary art galleries